Spark Media is an American independent multimedia and documentary production house based in Washington, D.C., United States.

History
Established in 1989 by director and producer Andrea Kalin, the company specializes in creating socially conscious media used to raise public awareness in America and throughout the world. The company has produced over a dozen films, including eleven  feature-length documentaries, including Scattering CJ, First Lady of the Revolution (Reel South on PBS), Red Lines (Free Speech TV), No Evidence of Disease (American Public Television, WorldChannel, V-me), Soul of a People: Writing America's Story (Smithsonian Channel), Worlds of Sounds: Ballard of Folkways (Smithsonian Channel), Talking Through Walls (PBS), Prince Among Slaves (PBS), Allah Made Me Funny (theatrical release),  The Pact (American Public Television), and Partners of the Heart (PBS American Experience).

Partners of the Heart, narrated by Morgan Freeman, aired on PBS’s American Experience in February 2003 and was rebroadcast in March 2005. Partners of the Heart went on to win the Erik Barnouw Award for Best History Documentary in 2004 and was later turned into the Golden Globe-nominated HBO film Something The Lord Made starring Mos Def, who also narrated Prince Among Slaves. As part of their 50th anniversary celebration, the National Endowment for the Humanities highlighted Partners of the Heart as one of 50 top grant projects that have enriched and shaped American lives.

Spark Media's films have won numerous awards, among them Emmys, CINE Golden Eagles, Gracies, as well as a Writers Guild of America nomination.

Current projects

Documentaries 
In early 2019, Spark Media completed production on Scattering CJ, the story of CJ Twomey, a seemingly happy Air Force recruit who violently ended his own life at age 20, whose passing plunged his family into unrelenting grief and guilt. Years later, in a moment of desperate inspiration, his mother put out an open call on Facebook, looking only for a handful of world travelers who might help fulfill her son's wish to see the world by scattering some of his ashes in a place of beauty or special meaning to them - a call that 21,000 would answer. Scattering CJ had its world premiere at the Camden International Film Festival in September 2019. On November 21st, 2020 the filmmakers hosted a live virtual conversation about the film and suicide prevention to commemorate International Survivors of Suicide Loss Day.

Spark Media is also producing an adaptation of Rita Dove's Sonata Mulattica, about George Bridgetower, a black musician and friend of Ludwig van Beethoven. The film, also entitled 'Sonata Mulattica,' will detail Bridgetower's life and relationship with Beethoven, and contrast that story to a contemporary young black musician, Joshua Coyne.

Spark Media is also in post-production on Klandestine Man, about Stetson Kennedy, the folklorist and social justice activist who famously infiltrated the Ku Klux Klan in the 1950s with the goal of dismantling the violent white supremacist group from the inside out.

Digital Projects 
With funding from the National Endowment for the Humanities Office of Digital Humanities, Spark Media began production on Project Maestro (now known as humanities.games) in 2019, an open-source platform that "empowers educators and students with limited computer access to make digital humanities games." The platform was first created for Spark Media's game The Search For Harmony, a web game about the rich, forgotten historical legacy of classical musicians of African descent.

In December 2020, Spark Media in collaboration with UXR Tech completed production on El 48, a virtual reality experience based on the abolition of the Costa Rican army. The exhibit was opened on December 1st, 2020, the anniversary of the abolition of the military, is currently housed at Museo Nacional de Costa Rica and is the first of its kind at the museum.

Podcasts 
Spark Media is currently in production on a podcast series called The People's Recorder which explores stories first unearthed by Works Progress Administration writers and artists in the 1930s. In partnership with the Stetson Kennedy Foundation, Spark Media will produce two Florida focused episodes funded by the Florida Humanities Council.

The podcast also received funding from Virginia Humanities.

Films

External links
 
 Spark Media on IMDb

References

 
Film production companies of the United States
Mass media companies established in 1989
Documentary film production companies
Mass media companies based in Washington, D.C.
1989 establishments in Washington, D.C.